Rhododendron veitchianum is a species of flowering plant in the heath family Ericaceae, native to Myanmar, Thailand, and Laos, where it grows at altitudes of  

In temperate zones Rhododendron veitchianum must be grown in a large greenhouse or conservatory, in extremely well-drained acidic (ericaceous) soil.

References

 Bot. Mag. 83: t. 4992. 1857.
 Plants of the World Online
 Encyclopedia of Life
 
 Hirsutum.com

veitchianum